Bagula Bhagat is a 1979 Bollywood action film thriller directed by Harmesh Malhotra. The film stars Ashok Kumar, Kamini Kaushal, Shatrughan Sinha and Shabana Azmi in lead roles.

Cast
Ashok Kumar   
Shatrughan Sinha  
Shabana Azmi  
Kamini Kaushal   
Mehmood Jr.  
Padma Khanna

Songs
All lyrics are written by Anjaan.

"Barso Beete" - Kishore Kumar, Amit Kumar
"Mehfil Me Meri Aaye Hai" - Kishore Kumar, Asha Bhosle
"Bum Bole Ke Bagto Ko" - Kishore Kumar, Mahendra Kapoor
"Chali Aayi Tere Pichhe" - Asha Bhosle

External links
 

1979 films
1970s Hindi-language films
1970s action thriller films
Indian action thriller films
Films scored by Kalyanji Anandji
Films directed by Harmesh Malhotra